Asarkhane Shahi (Persian:عصارخانه شاهی king's oil mill) museum is an ancient oil mill built at same time with Grand bazaar Isfahan and Molla Abdollah School, was constructed during the reign of Shah Abbas I in Safavid era. The main area of the Asarkhane Shahi was about 1,800 square, but now it is 380 square meters, the only remaining oil mill in the city, it was registered as national heritage of Iran in 1976.

References 

Museums in Isfahan
Tourist attractions in Isfahan